Gladovići may refer to:

 Gladovići (Srebrenica), a village in Srebrenica, Bosnia and Herzegovina
 Gladovići (Zenica), a village in City of Zenica, Bosnia and Herzegovina